Y-DNA haplogroups in populations of South Asia are haplogroups of the male Y-chromosome found in South Asian populations.

Major Y-chromosome DNA haplogroups in South Asia

South Asia, located on the crossroads of Western Eurasia and  Eastern Eurasia, accounts for about 39.49% of Asia's population, and over 24% of the world's population. It is home to a vast array of people who belong to diverse ethnic groups, who migrated to the region during different periods of time.

The presence of Himalayas in northern and eastern borders of South Asia have limited migrations from Eastern Eurasia into Indian subcontinent in the past. Hence most of the male-mediated migrations into South Asia occurred from Western Eurasia into the region, as seen in the Y-chromosome DNA Haplogroup variations of populations in the region.

The major paternal lineages of South Asian populations, represented by Y chromosomes, are haplogroups R1a1, R2, H, L, and J2, as well as O-M175 in some parts (northeastern region) of the Indian subcontinent.  Haplogroup R is the most observed Y-chromosome DNA haplogroup among the populations of South Asia, followed by H, L, and J, in the listed order. These four haplogroups together constitute nearly 80% of all male Y-chromosome DNA haplogroups found in various populations of the region. 

The Y-chromosome DNA Haplogroups R1a1, R2, L, and J2, which are found in higher frequencies among various populations of the Indian subcontinent, are also observed among various populations of Europe, Central Asia, and Middle East. Y-chromosome DNA haplogroups found in South Asia show strong affinity towards West Eurasian uniparental male line of ancestry while the mitochondrial DNA (mtDNA) haplogroups found in most of the populations of the region show an admixture of West Eurasian and indigenous ancient South Asian uniparental female lines of ancestries in contrast.

Some researchers have argued that Y-DNA Haplogroup R1a1 (M17) is of autochthonous South Asian origin. However, proposals for a Eurasian Steppe origin for R1a1 are also quite common and supported by several more recent studies. The spread of R1a1 in Indian subcontinent is associated with Indo-Aryan migrations into the region from South Central Asia that occurred around 3,500-4,000 years before present.

The Haplogroup R2 is mostly restricted to various populations of the Indian subcontinent, in addition to some populations of South Central Asia and parts of Middle East where it is observed in low frequencies. R2 has high frequency among the speakers of the Dravidian languages of South India and it spread throughout the Indian subcontinent during the spread of agriculture associated with the Neolithic Revolution, before the spread of R1a1 in the region.

The Haplogroup H (also known as the "Indian marker"), which is a direct descendant of the Upper Paleolithic Eurasian Haplogroup HIJK, is mostly restricted to South Asian populations of the Indian subcontinent, in addition to some populations of South Central Asia and eastern Iranian plateau, where it is found in low frequencies. It originated somewhere in the Middle East or South Central Asia and travelled to Indian subcontinent and adjoining areas of the eastern Iranian plateau around 40,000-50,000 years before present.

The Haplogroup L, which is thought to have originated near Pamir mountains of present-day Tajikistan in South Central Asia, travelled throughout Indian subcontinent during the Neolithic period, and it is associated with the spread of the Bronze Age Indus Valley Civilisation (IVC) in South Asia, which existed around 3,300-5,300 years before present. It is also observed among many populations of the Iranian plateau. The spread of the Haplogroup J2 from Iranian plateau into Indian subcontinent also occurred during the Neolithic period, alongside L.

The Haplogroup O-M175, which is a major haplogroup observed among the populations of East and Southeast Asia, is found among many Austroasiatic and Tibeto-Burman speakers of northeastern regions of the Indian subcontinent.

Frequencies in South Asian ethnic groups

Listed below are some notable groups and populations from South Asia by human Y-chromosome DNA haplogroups based on various relevant studies.

The samples are taken from individuals identified with specific linguistic designations (IE=Indo-European, Dr=Dravidian, AA=Austro-Asiatic, ST=Sino-Tibetan) and individual linguistic groups, the third column (n) gives the sample size studied, and the other columns give the percentage of the respective haplogroups.

Majority of the Indo-European (IE) speakers of South Asia speak Indo-Aryan languages, followed by Iranian languages, both of which belong to Indo-Iranian branch of the Indo-European language family. They form around 75% of the South Asian populations.

The Dravidian (Dr) speakers of South Asia are mostly clustered in South India and Balochistan. They form around 20% of the South Asian populations.

The Sino-Tibetan (ST) speakers in northeastern parts of the Indian subcontinent speak various languages belonging to Tibeto-Burman branch of the Sino-Tibetan language family.

The Austroasiatic (AA) speakers of South Asia are scattered in parts of East India and Bangladesh.

Note: The converted frequencies from some old studies conducted in 2000s may lead to unsubstantial frequencies below. Table below has been sorted in alphabetical order based on the name of the population.

Chronological development of haplogroups

See also 
South Asia
Demographics of South Asia
Genetics and archaeogenetics of South Asia
Languages of South Asia
MtDNA haplogroups in populations of South Asia
South Asian ethnic groups
Y-DNA haplogroups by population
Y-DNA haplogroups in populations of the Near East
Y-DNA haplogroups in populations of the Caucasus
Y-DNA haplogroups in populations of Central and North Asia
Y-DNA haplogroups in populations of East and Southeast Asia
Y-DNA haplogroups in populations of Europe
Y-DNA haplogroups in populations of North Africa
Y-DNA haplogroups in populations of Sub-Saharan Africa
Y-DNA haplogroups in populations of Oceania
Y-DNA haplogroups in indigenous peoples of the Americas

References

External links 
Y-DNA Ethnographic and Genographic Atlas and Open-Source Data Compilation

Asia South